Events from the year 1319 in Ireland.

Incumbent
Lord: Edward II

Events

 A bridge over the River Liffey was built. It resulted in the urban centre of Old Kilcullen (now simply Kilcullen) moving 2 km north-east to the bridge.